George Frederick Vernon (20 June 1856 – 10 August 1902) was an English cricketer who played first-class cricket for Middlesex County Cricket Club. He also played one Test match for England during the first-ever Ashes tour in 1882-83.

Biography
Vernon was the son of George Vernon of 32 Montagu Square. He was educated at Rugby School, and first appeared at Lord's as a member of the Rugby eleven in 1873, and was captain in 1874. He later went on to play 103 first-class games for Middlesex. Besides the 1882–83 tour, he also toured Australia in 1887–88.

Vernon toured India and Ceylon (now Sri Lanka) in 1889-90 as the leader of a team of amateurs, of which the other notable player was Lord Hawke. The other players could not really be said to be first-class, but the team was of a quality much higher than any seen in India at that time. This was the first ever tour by a foreign team to India. They won seven games and drew another before they were due to play the Parsi Gymkhana of Bombay (now Mumbai) on 30 January 1890, just after that great cricket stalwart, Lord Harris, had been named as the next Governor of the Bombay Presidency. The match was billed as being for the "Cricket Championship of India". At the time it was the greatest sporting event to have happened in Bombay, and to the astonishment of the British rulers, the Parsi side won.

Vernon toured India again in 1892-93 as part of a team led by Lord Hawke that also lost to the Parsis. His last first-class game, which was for the Marylebone Cricket Club came in 1898.

He represented the England national rugby union team as a forward on five occasions.

By profession Vernon was a barrister, who was called to the Bar at the Middle Temple. He was engaged in the colonial service, and worked for the West Africa Police in the Gold Coast Colony at the time of his death.

Vernon died aged 46 of malaria fever in the Gold Coast (now Ghana).

References

 A Corner of a Foreign Field: The Indian History of a British Sport by Ramachandra Guha

External links
 
 Brief profile of G.F.Vernon by Don Ambrose
 Scrum: George Vernon

1856 births
1902 deaths
A. J. Webbe's XI cricketers
C. I. Thornton's XI cricketers
East of England cricketers
England international rugby union players
England Test cricketers
English cricketers
English rugby union players
Free Foresters cricketers
Gentlemen cricketers
Gentlemen of England cricketers
H. Philipson's XI cricketers
I Zingari cricketers
Lord Hawke's XI cricketers
Lord March's XI cricketers
Marylebone Cricket Club cricketers
Members of the Middle Temple
Middlesex cricketers
North v South cricketers
Orleans Club cricketers
Over 30s v Under 30s cricketers
People educated at Rugby School
Rugby union players from Marylebone